Alamos may refer to:

Álamos, Sonora, Mexico
The plural form of The Alamo
Alamos Gold, a Canadian gold mining company

People with the surname
Damien Alamos (born 1990), French kickboxer
Julio Álamos (born 1991), Chilean boxer